WHTB (1400 AM) is a Portuguese language radio station in Fall River, Massachusetts, operating with 1 kW unlimited hours.

History
WALE began broadcasting May 6, 1948, on 1400 kHz with 250 watts power (full-time). It was owned by Narragansett Broadcasting Company. The station's first location was at the corner of North Main Street and Central Street in Fall River, Massachusetts, known as the Durfee Theatre Building. The station's "Whale" was a plaster and chicken wire figure atop the building with the words "WALE 1400" on the sides in white paint.  The transmitting antenna was on the roof and had a copper screen ground system. There was no real ground connection to the antenna, and the screen created an artificial grounding system, limiting the coverage area.

The WALE, call sign moved to 990 AM in Providence, Rhode Island on July 20, 1989.  On that date, SNE Broadcasting Ltd. (owned by local businessmen Robert and James Karam) took ownership of 1400 AM and introduced the WHTB call sign. 

In 2018, WHTB signed on FM translator W229DC on 93.7 from the AM tower.

Personalities
Personalities included Mike "Surfer" Sands (Arthur Lang) and long-time engineer Stephen J. Sorel, who was also an Amateur Radio operator with the call sign K1RFH. Sorel and Lang made the move to WICE in Providence, Rhode Island in the early 1970s. Steve Sorel ended his career as the Chief Engineer of WHTB and sister station WSAR. The North Main Street/Central Street site was also the location of WCFR-FM and WCFR-TV, although it is not known if WCFR-TV ever produced a signal as after World War II the Channel 1 assignment (44-50Mc.) was dropped from television and given to the Business Radio Service. WALE moved to Rock Street in the early 1970s and the transmitter was relocated to the area along Interstate 195 West and Route 24 South at the end of Augustus St. and remains there today. The studios have moved to Home Street in Somerset, Massachusetts as WHTB and WSAR are still owned by the Karams.

F.M. translator

References

1992 Broadcasting Yearbook, page A-164

External links

Portuguese-American culture in Massachusetts
Portuguese-language radio stations in the United States
Fall River, Massachusetts
HTB
Mass media in Bristol County, Massachusetts
Radio stations established in 1948
HTB